Station Road is a cricket ground in Darley Dale, Derbyshire, England, which has hosted only one top-class match: the 1975 John Player League match between Derbyshire and Hampshire. The away side won by 70 runs thanks to fifties from Barry Richards and Gordon Greenidge, and Thomas Mottram and John Rice taking five and four wickets respectively.

References

External links
 Cricinfo Website - Ground Page
 Cricket Archive page

Cricket grounds in Derbyshire